Ballons is a commune in the department of Drôme in the Auvergne-Rhône-Alpes region in southeastern France.

See also
Communes of the Drôme department

References

Communes of Drôme